

Introduction

Porcelana Futebol Clube do Cazengo is an Angolan sports club from the city of Ndalatando, in the northern province of Kwanza Norte.

The club was registered with the Angolan Football Federation in October 2009.

Eighteen years after the province's last representative – EKA do Dondo – was relegated, Porcelana was promoted to Angola's premier football league, the Girabola.

Achievements
Angolan League: 0

Angolan Cup: 0

Angolan Super Cup: 0

Angolan 2nd Division: 1
 2012
Cuanza Norte provincial championship:  1
 2015

League & Cup Positions

Recent seasons
Porcelana FC's season-by-season performance since 2011:

 PR = Preliminary round, 1R = First round, GS = Group stage, R32 = Round of 32, R16 = Round of 16, QF = Quarter-finals, SF = Semi-finals

Players and staff

Staff

Players

Manager history

See also
Girabola (2016)
Gira Angola

References

External links
 2013 squad at girabola.com
 Club logo
 Girabola.com Profile

Association football clubs established in 1920
Football clubs in Angola
Sports clubs in Angola